"Heathen Child" is the fourth single by alternative rock group Grinderman and first from their second studio album, Grinderman 2. Released on 6 September 2010, the song is the first release from Grinderman in three years and is also the band's first limited edition double a-side single.

Background and production
Singer Nick Cave spoke of the song with Uncut magazine, mentioning that "Heathen Child" was "a quest to break from narrative song-writing in to something more impressionistic."

On 27 July 2010 the final studio version of the song was previewed on music website Soundcloud by Mute Records.

Critical reception
The song was described on Sonic Masala as "squalid, diseased, filthy, and oh so seductive."

Track listing and formats
Digital download
"Heathen Child" – 5:01

Limited edition 12" vinyl
"Heathen Child" – 5:01
"Star Charmer"
"Super Heathen Child"

Music video
A series of trailers for the album directed by John Hillcoat have been released on Grinderman's official website and by Mute Records since 28 June 2010. Recorded near Westway in London, the music video for "Heathen Child" features a "naked lady lying in a bath of something milky." Cave explained elements of the music video noting that "the video follows the fortunes of a worringly young white girl as she sits in a bath, confronted by the panoply of fiends that occupy her subconscious." The video premiered on NME's Video Box on August 9, 2010.

Musicians and personnel
Grinderman
 Nick Cave – lead vocals, electric guitar, organ, piano, production
Warren Ellis – acoustic guitar, viola, violin, electric bouzouki, electric mandolin, backing vocals, production
Martyn Casey – bass guitar, acoustic guitar, backing vocals, production
Jim Sclavunos – drums, percussion, backing vocals, production

Guest musicians
Robert Fripp – electric guitar on "Super Heathen Child"

Technical personnel
Nick Launay – production, engineering
Kevin Paul - co-production
Tom Hough - assistant production (at State of the Ark)
David "Saxon" Greenep - assistant production (at State of the Ark)
Russell Fawkus - assistant production (at Assault & Battery 2)

Chart positions

References

2010 songs
Songs written by Nick Cave
Song recordings produced by Nick Launay
2010 singles